The Meek Channel is a strait separating Galindez Island from Grotto Island and Corner Island in the Argentine Islands, Wilhelm Archipelago, Antarctica. It was charted in 1935 by the British Graham Land Expedition under John Rymill, and named for William McC. Meek, marine architect and surveyor, who was of assistance in preparing the expedition ship Penola for the voyage.

References

Straits of the Wilhelm Archipelago